UFC 283: Teixeira vs. Hill was a mixed martial arts event produced by the Ultimate Fighting Championship that took place on January 21, 2023, at the Jeunesse Arena in Rio de Janeiro, Brazil.

Background
The event marked the promotion's return to Brazil for the first time since UFC Fight Night: Lee vs. Oliveira, which took place in Brasília in March 2020. That event took place behind closed doors (for the first time in the promotion's history) after Ibaneis Rocha, the governor of the Federal District (where Brasília is located), announced that large gatherings had been suspended due to the COVID-19 pandemic.

A UFC Light Heavyweight Championship bout for the vacant title between former champion Glover Teixeira and Jamahal Hill headlined the event. Teixeira was originally expected to compete at UFC 282 as a challenger in a rematch against then-champion Jiří Procházka, but Procházka pulled out and vacated the title after a serious shoulder injury. Teixeira subsequently refused a replacement fight against Magomed Ankalaev, which prompted the UFC to change the original co-main event between former champion Jan Błachowicz and Ankalaev into the new title fight for the vacant belt. After that contest ended in a split draw, the organization decided to book Teixeira and Hill, who was scheduled to headline an event against former title challenger Anthony Smith in early March. Smith was expected to serve as an alternate for the title bout. However, he weighed in at 206.5 pounds on his second attempt and was unable to compete if necessary.

A UFC Flyweight Championship unification tetralogy bout between current two-time champion Deiveson Figueiredo and former champion/current interim title holder Brandon Moreno took place at the event. The pairing first met at UFC 256 on December 12, 2020, which ended in a majority draw (Figueiredo retained the title). Their second meeting took place at UFC 263 on June 12, 2021, where Moreno captured the title by submission in the third round. Their third meeting took place at UFC 270 on January 22, 2022, where Figueiredo regained the title by unanimous decision. Alexandre Pantoja served as backup and potential replacement for this fight.

A women's featherweight bout between Josiane Nunes and Zarah Fairn dos Santos took place at the event. They were originally scheduled to meet at UFC on ESPN: Whittaker vs. Gastelum in April 2021, but on the day of the weigh-ins Fairn weighed in at 147 pounds, eight pounds over the pre-established limit of 139 pounds (the bout was originally set for the women's bantamweight division, but was shifted to a catchweight prior to the start of the weigh-ins). The bout was cancelled due to the weight discrepancy, as Nunes weighed in at 136 pounds.

A heavyweight bout between Shamil Abdurakhimov and Jailton Almeida took place at the event. They were previously scheduled to meet at UFC 279 and UFC 280 but Abdurakhimov withdrew both times due to visa issues and for undisclosed reasons respectively.
 
Guram Kutateladze was expected to face Thiago Moisés in a lightweight bout at this event. However, Kutateladze pulled out in early January for undisclosed reasons. He was replaced by promotional newcomer Melquizael Costa.

A middleweight bout between Brad Tavares and former LFA Middleweight Champion Gregory Rodrigues was expected to take place at the event. However, Tavares withdrew from the bout due to an injury. He was replaced by promotional newcomer Brunno Ferreira.

During the event's broadcast, the inaugural and former two-time UFC Featherweight Champion José Aldo (also former WEC Featherweight Champion) was announced as the next "modern wing" UFC Hall of Fame inductee.

Results

Bonus awards 
The following fighters received $50,000 bonuses.
Fight of the Night: Jamahal Hill vs. Glover Teixeira
Performance of the Night: Jailton Almeida and Ismael Bonfim

See also 

 List of UFC events
 List of current UFC fighters
 2023 in UFC

References 

Ultimate Fighting Championship events
2023 in mixed martial arts
Mixed martial arts in Brazil
International sports competitions in Rio de Janeiro (city)
2023 in Brazilian sport
January 2023 sports events in Brazil